ISEA International (pronounced  , like "Isaiah") is an international non-profit organization which encourages "interdisciplinary academic discourse" and exposure for "culturally diverse organizations and individuals working with art, science and technology."

ISEA International is best known for sponsoring the annual International Symposium on Electronic Art (ISEA), an annual gathering of the international art, science and technology community. The symposium includes an academic conference, exhibitions, performances and workshops. It is a nomadic event and is held in a different location every year. ISEA allows individuals and organizations from around the world to come together annually, share and experience the intersection of emerging technologies and art. ISEA includes both visual and performing art that intersect with various types of technology in its symposia. ISEA is managed by the ISEA International Foundation Board who organize and ensure the quality of content for each symposia.

In an important move for ISEA, an agreement with University of Brighton to establish an ISEA Headquarters was signed in July 2009. ISEA HQ provides an administrative, academic and creative base for ISEA and develops a fruitful partnership with a leading research University. In 2022, a new agreement was signed with the University for the Creative Arts, which is where the new headquarters is now based.

History 
ISEA has its roots in the symposia begun in 1988 in Utrecht, the Netherlands, in order to support the founding and maintenance of an international network of organisations and individuals active in the field of the electronic arts. The idea behind its creation was to create a network for those who are active and interested in electronic arts. The organization was later founded in 1990 in The Netherland, as an international membership association called the Inter-Society for the Electronic Arts. The Board and membership of ISEA has always been international, bringing together individuals and organisations from around the world. From the founding of ISEA until 1996 the organisation was based in the Netherlands. From 1996 to 2001, ISEA headquarters was based in Montréal, Canada. After a period of a provisional HQ again in the Netherlands, in 2008 a new Headquarters was established at the University of Brighton, United Kingdom. The Inter-Society existed for over 15 years as a membership organisation and in 2009 ISEA was changed from the association to a foundation called “ISEA International” and the headquarters moved to the UK.

The organisation is now managed by the ISEA International foundation board, whose main role is to select the host city of each symposium. The foundation board works closely with the host to ensure that the goals of ISEA are achieved. Historically the symposia were held as both a biennial and annual event. As of 2009, the symposium has been held annually again.

ISEA is one of the most prominent international events on art and technology around the world, bringing together scholarly, artistic, and scientific domains in an interdisciplinary discussion and showcase of creative productions applying new technologies in electronic art, interactivity and digital media.

The ISEA International Headquarters was previously hosted at the University of Brighton in the UK; where Sue Gollifer was the Executive Director of the ISEA International Headquarters. In 2022 it was announced that the University for the Creative Arts would become the new headquarters for the organisation, and that Jeremiah Ambrose would be taking over from Sue Gollifer as the new Executive Director of the ISEA International Headquarters.

International Advisory Committee 
The  Isea International Advisory Committee (IIAC) is composed of international experts from the fields of art, science and technology. Their role is to advise ISEA International foundation board. As of 2017, the IIAC is chaired by Wim van der Plas, who is also Honorary Chair of the IIAC.

ISEA Symposium Archives 

ISEA maintains an archive with resources available to the public. Beginning in 2012, the development of a new archive commenced with text and PDF information available for the proceedings, catalogs, presentation abstracts, artist statements, and workshops. A new archive is in development to include images and rich media. This new archive interconnects the data to create a myriad of ways to retrieve the information.  It also has contributor pages that connect to all the papers, presentations, artworks and other  contributions to the ISEA symposium. The new archive also enables the export  of data for visualizations as well as a map of the location of all the contributors to the ISEA symposia. Although this new archive is currently in-progress, it is also available to the public.

International Symposium on Electronic Art (ISEA)

Previous and future symposia have included:

 Utrecht, Netherlands (FISEA, 1988)
 Groningen, Netherlands (SISEA, 1990)
 Sydney, Australia(TISEA, 1992)
 Minneapolis, Minnesota, U.S. (FISEA, 1993)
 Helsinki, Finland (ISEA94)
 Montreal, Quebec, Canada (ISEA95)
 Rotterdam, Netherlands (ISEA96)
 Chicago, U.S. (ISEA97)
 ISEA97 was held on September 22 through 27. There were two days of workshops on technology and new approaches to teaching, followed by three days of academic sessions with keynote speakers. The theme was "Content."
 Liverpool/Manchester, UK (ISEA98)
 Paris, France (ISEA2000)
 Nagoya, Japan (ISEA2002)
 Baltic Sea; Tallinn, Estonia; Helsinki, Finland (ISEA2004)
 San Jose, California, U.S. (ISEA2006)
 ISEA2006 had submissions from over 1,800 artists from around the world; only 150 were chosen. Overall, it was estimated that ISEA2006 could have over 50,000 visitors. The theme was "Interactive City."
 Singapore, (ISEA2008)
 Belfast, Northern Ireland, (ISEA2009)
 Ruhr, Germany, (ISEA2010)
 Istanbul, Turkey, (ISEA2011)
 Albuquerque, New Mexico, U.S. (ISEA2012)
 The theme was "Machine Wilderness" and focused on art, technology and nature. The symposium took place on September 19–24 and included over 100 artists and 400 presenters from 29 different countries.
 Sydney, Australia, (ISEA2013)
 ISEA2013 took place on June 7–16 with over 220 speakers and seven keynote addresses from experts in related fields.
 Dubai, United Arab Emirates, (ISEA2014)
 Vancouver, British Columbia, Canada, (ISEA2015)
 Hong Kong SAR, People's Republic of China, (ISEA2016)
 Manizales, Colombia, (ISEA2017)
 Durban, South Africa, (ISEA2018)
 Gwangju, South Korea, (ISEA2019)
 ISEA2019 took place on June 22-28. The theme was "Lux Aeterna(Eternal Light)" and inspired by the literal meaning of the host city Gwangju, "City of Light."
 Online, Why Sentience?, (ISEA2020)
 Barcelona, Spain, (ISEA2022)
 Paris, France, (ISEA2023)

References

External links
 ISEA website

International non-profit organizations
Organisations based in the Netherlands

 ISEA Symposium Archive
 new ISEA Symposium Archive, under construction
 ISEA 2022